Daniel John E. S. Elliott (born 29 September 1995) is an English professional footballer who plays as a forward for  club Scunthorpe United.

A former youth-team player at Nottingham Forest and Aston Villa, Elliott played college soccer in the United States with Hofstra Pride and later represented North Carolina FC U23 and the Long Island Rough Riders. He joined Spanish club San Cristóbal in October 2018 and then signed with English Football League side Port Vale in January 2019. Released by Port Vale in May 2019, he signed with Chester two months later. He was loaned out to Alfreton Town in January 2020. He signed with Hartlepool United in April 2021 and helped the club to win promotion out of the National League via the play-offs two months later. He remained in non-League however, signing with National League North side Boston United in July 2021. He was named as Boston's Player of the Year for the 2021–22 season. At the end of the season, Elliott turned down a new contract with Boston and moved up a division to sign for Boreham Wood. He was loaned out to Gateshead in December 2022 and transferred to Scunthorpe United two months later.

Early and personal life
Born in Nottingham, Elliott attended West Bridgford School. He earned a BA in economics from Hofstra University in May 2018.

Career

Early career
Elliott began his career with the youth teams of Aston Villa and Nottingham Forest where he received a two year scholarship before moving on to collegiate soccer in New York America.

He played college soccer for the Hofstra Pride between 2014 and 2017. He also spent time with North Carolina FC U23, and the Long Island Rough Riders. He made his PDL debut for the Rough Riders on 24 June 2018, in a 1–0 defeat at Reading United. He made a further five appearances, scoring one goal in 3–2 victory over Evergreen at the Hofstra University Soccer Stadium.

Port Vale
He signed for Spanish Tercera División club San Cristóbal in October 2018. He left the club in January 2019 to trial with English League Two club Port Vale. The trial was successful and later that month he signed for Port Vale until the end of the 2018–19 season. He made his debut in the English Football League on 19 January, coming on for Ricky Miller as a 75th-minute substitute in a 1–0 win at Crawley Town. After the match, Port Vale manager Neil Aspin said that "Danny is a gamble. We have put him on today but if we had more strikers he wouldn't be thrown in the deep end". After three months playing reserve team football, he returned to the first-team to impress new manager John Askey as a substitute against Stevenage on 19 April. However Askey confirmed that he would not be offering Elliott a new contract on 16 May.

Chester
Elliott joined National League North club Chester on a one-year deal in July 2019, following a successful trial spell in which he scored against Wigan Athletic in a pre-season friendly at the Deva Stadium. He moved on loan to league rivals Alfreton Town in January 2020. He scored a hat-trick on his debut for the "Reds" in a 6–1 victory over Gloucester City at North Street on 28 January.
 He ended the loan spell with five goals from five games and was put back into the first-team following his return to the Deva Stadium. He scored three goals in 21 appearances for Chester in the 2019–20 season, which was permanently suspended on 26 March due to the COVID-19 pandemic in England, with Chester in the play-offs in seventh place. They were knocked out of the play-offs with a 3–1 loss at Altrincham. He scored eight goals in 22 games before the 2020–21 season was also curtailed due to the COVID-19 pandemic. On 12 April 2021, it was announced that Elliott had left Chester.

Hartlepool United
On 14 April 2021, Elliott signed with National League club Hartlepool United on a contract until the end of the season. Elliott made his debut for Hartlepool as a substitute in a 7–2 victory at Wealdstone. Elliott scored his first goal for Hartlepool in a 4–2 defeat to Maidenhead United on 8 May. Hartlepool reached the final of the play-offs against Torquay United at Ashton Gate Stadium, with Elliott featuring as a 72nd-minute substitute for Rhys Oates; promotion to the Football League was secured with a penalty shoot-out victory, during which Elliott scored his penalty. He was released by Hartlepool at the end of the 2020–21 season.

Boston United
On 14 July 2021, Elliott joined National League side Boston United and scored in his first appearance in a Boston shirt as the "Pilgrims" beat Lincoln United in the Lincolnshire Senior Cup. He scored 27 goals from 48 appearances throughout the 2021–22 season, his 19 league goals making him the division's fifth highest scorer and helping Boston to qualify for the play-offs. Elliott won both the Fans' and Players' Player of the Year at the club's end of season awards. He scored three goals in the play-offs, helping Boston to advance past Kidderminster Harriers and AFC Fylde, though they were denied promotion after losing 2–0 to York City in the final. At the end of the season, Elliott was named in the National League North team of the year.

Boreham Wood
After turning down a new contract with Boston, Elliott signed for National League side Boreham Wood on 1 July 2022. He scored two goals in his first fifteen starts for the club. On 3 December 2022, Elliott signed on loan for National League rivals Gateshead until the end of the 2022–23 season. He won Gateshead's Player of the Month award for December. After six goals in nine games in all competitions for Gateshead, Elliott was recalled by Boreham Wood on 31 January 2023. Wood manager Luke Garrard explained that “we always had an agreement that he needed to go out and get game time, confidence and goals, and he has definitely stuck to his side of the bargain”.

Scunthorpe United
On 6 February 2023, Elliott transferred to National League side Scunthorpe United for an undisclosed fee. He said that his aim was to score the goals needed to steer the club out of the relegation zone.

Career statistics

Honours
Hartlepool United
National League play-offs: 2021

Individual
Boston United Players' Player of the Year: 2021–22
Boston United Fans' Player of the Year: 2021–22

References

1995 births
Living people
Footballers from Nottingham
English footballers
Association football forwards
Hofstra Pride men's soccer players
Nottingham Forest F.C. players
Aston Villa F.C. players
North Carolina FC U23 players
Long Island Rough Riders players
Port Vale F.C. players
Chester F.C. players
Alfreton Town F.C. players
Hartlepool United F.C. players
Boston United F.C. players
Boreham Wood F.C. players
Gateshead F.C. players
Scunthorpe United F.C. players
USL League Two players
Tercera División players
English Football League players
National League (English football) players
English expatriate footballers
Expatriate footballers in Spain
Expatriate soccer players in the United States
English expatriate sportspeople in Spain
English expatriate sportspeople in the United States
Black British sportspeople
People educated at West Bridgford School